Columbus Public Library may refer to:

 Columbus Public Library, a branch of the Chattahoochee Valley Libraries in Georgia
 Columbus Public Carnegie Library, Columbus, Kansas, listed on the National Register of Historic Places in Cherokee County, Kansas
 Columbus Public Library (Columbus, Nebraska), current and historic Carnegie library
 Columbus Metropolitan Library, Columbus, Ohio
 Columbus Public Library (Columbus, Wisconsin), listed on the National Register of Historic Places in Columbia County, Wisconsin
 Columbus Public Library (Columbus, Georgia), Chattahoochee Valley Libraries